WVSL (1240 AM) is a radio station licensed to serve Saranac Lake, New York, United States. Established in 1927 as WNBZ, the station is owned by Jonathan Becker and Gregory Gallacher, through licensee North Country Radio Corp.

In June 2017, the Adirondack Daily Enterprise reported that WNBZ had been silent since at least 2016. The station had simulcast an adult contemporary format with WNBZ-FM (106.3). WNBZ's "Radio Park" studio and transmitter facility was put up for tax auction in November 2017. On November 22, 2017, Saranac Lake Radio, LLC filed to sell the station to North Country Radio, owner of WSLP (93.3 FM), for $6,000; the new owners would be required to change WNBZ's call sign, and also received a right of first refusal to purchase Lake Placid sister station WLPW (105.5 FM). Concurrently, the "Radio Park" properties were withdrawn from the Essex County tax auction list. North Country Radio's purchase of WNBZ was consummated on February 9, 2018, and the new owners changed the station's call sign to WVSL on February 28, 2018.

Translator

References

External links

VSL (AM)
Radio stations established in 1927
1927 establishments in New York (state)
Mainstream rock radio stations in the United States